Ivy Meeropol (born 1968) is a director and producer of documentaries for film and television, known for Indian Point and Heir to an Execution. She is the daughter of Michael Meeropol and Ann Karus Meeropol and granddaughter of Julius and Ethel Rosenberg, and adoptive granddaughter of Abel Meeropol (pen name:  Lewis Allan), author of "Strange Fruit" and "The House I Live In". A graduate of Sarah Lawrence College, she served as a legislative aide to Congressman Harry Johnston (D-Florida).

Career 
Meeropol worked as a speechwriter and legislative aide to Congressman Harry Johnston (D-Florida), and then began a career as a journalist, publishing articles in The New York Times, O, The Oprah Magazine, Premiere, Nest, Paper, Black Book Magazine, and Provincetown Arts Magazine, where she was also the fiction editor.
Meeropol produced her film, Heir to an Execution, to explore her family's conflicted views of the Rosenbergs' trial and subsequent execution. The film was featured at the Sundance Film Festival and was shortlisted for an Academy Award. In a 2004 interview with FF2 Media's Jan Huttner, Meeropol commented on the connection between the events in the film and the then-current Bush administration:The McCarthy era was all about quashing dissent in the name of national security, and that's what we're doing today. There were massive, peaceful marches in the period leading up to the start of the Iraq War, but the protesters were told that they were "unpatriotic." You don't support the troops if you have any questions for the government? This country is supposed to be about encouraging dissent; that's the beauty of democracy.Ivy Meeropol also directed a six-part documentary series for the Sundance Channel entitled The Hill.  It focused on the work of four young staff members at the office of congressman Robert Wexler (D-FL) as they responded to his electoral defeat in the 2004 presidential election. The documentary aired on the Sundance Channel in August and September 2006.

In 2013 Meeropol was a Sundance Institute Fellow, and was awarded grants from the Sundance Documentary Fund, The NY State Council for the Arts, and The MacArthur Foundation.

In 2016, Meeropol directed and produced the documentary film, Indian Point.  The film explores the issues surrounding the use of nuclear energy by looking at the Indian Point Energy Center, located just 35 miles from the heart of New York City.

In 2019, Meeropol revisited the story of her grandparents to inquire into the man who prosecuted them, Roy Cohn. She directed and produced Bully. Coward. Victim. The Story of Roy Cohn. In an interview with Women and Hollywood, Meeropol pointed out the urgency of the Roy Cohn story in light of the Trump administration:I want people to understand why Donald Trump’s relationship with Cohn is critically important, and help audiences to gain a deeper insight into how Cohn helped set Trump on a path that reverberates today. This film is my way of impressing upon audiences that the past is very much present, and we would be wise not to forget how we got here.

Personal life
Ivy Meeropol lives in the Hudson Valley with her husband, production designer Thomas Ambrose, and their two children.

Filmography

Notes

External links 
 CBS story on Heir to an Execution
 
The Hill – Production Company Official Site

1968 births
Living people
American documentary filmmakers
American people of Russian-Jewish descent
Sarah Lawrence College alumni
Julius and Ethel Rosenberg
Place of birth missing (living people)